

Major regions of Vancouver Island, BC

Unincorporated Settlements and Townships

See also 
 List of communities in British Columbia (All unincorporated communities across British Columbia listed)
 Unincorporated Areas and Settlements (Wiki article explainer)

References 

Lists of populated places in British Columbia